The Lexicon Iconographicum Mythologiae Classicae (abbreviated LIMC) is a multivolume encyclopedia cataloguing representations of mythology in the plastic arts of classical antiquity. Published serially from 1981 to 2009, it is the most extensive resource of its kind, providing "full and detailed information." Entries are arranged alphabetically, with black-and-white illustrations indexed to their respective entries.

The work was prepared by international scholars from nearly 40 countries who contributed in their language of choice, resulting in entries written variously in English, German, French, or Italian. LIMC also offers a multilingual online database that is updated independently of the print publication.

LIMC has been called an "indispensable research instrument," "monumental," and "magnificent."

In the  United States, LIMC is based at the Alexander Library of Rutgers University.

Volumes  
 Lexicon Iconographicum Mythologiae Classicae (LIMC), Artemis & Winkler Verlag (Zürich, München, Düsseldorf), 1981-1999 
Vol. I:	Aara - Aphlad (1981)
Vol. II:	Aphrodisias - Athena (1984)
Vol. III:	Atherion - Eros / Amor, Cupido (1986)
Vol. IV:	Eros (in Etruria) - Herakles (1988)
Vol. V:	Herakles - Kenchrias (1990)
Vol. VI:	Kentauroi et Kentaurides - Oiax (1992)
Vol. VII:	Oidipous - Theseus (1994)
Vol. VIII:	Thespiades - Zodiacus et Supplementum (1997)
Indices
1.  Museums, Collections, Sites (1999)
2.  Literary and Epigraphical Sources mentioning lost Works. Mythological Names (1999)

 Lexicon Iconographicum Mythologiae Classicae. Supplementum 2009 (LIMC), Artemis Verlag (Düsseldorf), 2009.

References

External links 
 Fondation pour le Lexicon Iconographicum Mythologiae Classicae (LIMC)
 Digital LIMC
 LIMC-France

Mythology
Classical art
Classics publications
References on Greek mythology
Iconography